Water sports or aquatic sports are sport activities conducted on waterbodies, and can be categorized according to the degree of immersion by the participants.

On the water 

 Boat racing, the use of powerboats to participate in races
 Boating, the use of boats for personal recreation
 Cable skiing, similar to wake boarding but with cables for artificial maneuvering
 Canoe polo combines boating and ball handling skills with a contact team game, where tactics and positional play are as important as the speed and fitness of the individual athletes.
 Canoeing is an activity which involves paddling a canoe with a single-bladed paddle. Most present-day canoeing is done as or as a part of a sport or recreational activity. 
 Dragon boat racing, teams of 20 paddlers racing the ancient dragon boat
 Fishing, the recreation and sport of catching fish
 Flyboard, a brand of hydroflighting device which supplies propulsion to drive the Flyboard into the air to perform a sport known as hydroflying.
 Jet Skiing, performed with a recreational watercraft that the rider sits or stands on, rather than sits inside of, as in a boat.
 Jet Boarding is a powered surf board usually by 2 stroke engine or electric power. 
 Kayaking, the use of a kayak for moving across water
 Kiteboating, the act of using a kite rig as a power source to propel a boat
 Kneeboarding, an aquatic sport where the participant is towed on a buoyant, convex, and hydrodynamically shaped board at a planing speed, most often behind a motorboat.
 Paddleboarding, where a person uses a large surfboard and paddle to surf on flat water or waves
 Parasailing, where a person is towed behind a vehicle (usually a boat) while attached to a parachute
 Picigin, a traditional Croatian ball game  that is played on the beach. It is an amateur sport played in shallow water, consisting of players keeping a small ball from touching the water. 
 Rafting, recreational outdoor activities which use an inflatable raft to navigate a river or other body of water
 River trekking, a combination of trekking and climbing and sometimes swimming along the river
 Rowing, a sport that involves propelling a boat (racing shell) on water, using oars
 Sailing, the practice of navigating a sail-powered craft on water, ice, or land
 Sit-down hydrofoiling is riding on the water with a hydrofoil attached to a ski.
Skimboarding, a sport where people use a wooden board to slide fast on water.
Stone skipping, a sport where people compete for number of times and length that they can skip a stone on the water's surface.
Surfing, a sport where an individual uses a board to stand up and ride on the face of a wave.
Wakeboarding, a sport where an individual is attached to a board via bindings and then holds a handle to be towed across the water while riding sideways.
Wakeskating, a sport where the rider stands on a board and is towed across the water performing maneuvers similar to those seen in skateboarding.
Wakesurfing, a sport where the individual surfs on the wake created by a boat without holding onto the handle.
Water skiing, a sport where an individual holds onto a rope and handle while being towed across the water while riding one or two water skis.
 White water rafting, rafting on various classes of river rapids
 Wing foiling, a sport where an individual holds a lightweight wing on a surf board with a hydrofoil.
Yachting, the use of recreational boats and ships called yachts, for racing or cruising

In the water 
 Aquajogging, is a cross-training and rehabilitation method using low-impact resistance training. It is a way to train without impacting joints. Participants wear a flotation device and move in a running motion in the deep end of a pool. Aside from a pool, the equipment can include a flotation belt and weights.
 Artistic or synchronized swimming consists of swimmers performing a synchronized routine of elaborate moves in the water, accompanied by music.
 Diving, the sport of jumping off springboards or platforms into water
 Finswimming is a sport similar to traditional swimming using fins, monofin, snorkel, and other specific devices
 Modern pentathlon includes épée fencing, pistol shooting, swimming, a show jumping course on horseback, and cross country running
 Rescue swimming is swimming to rescue other swimmers                                                                      
 Swimming, including pool swimming and open water swimming
 Synchronized diving, Two divers form a team and perform dives simultaneously. The dives are identical.
 Triathlon, a multi-sport event involving the completion of three continuous and sequential endurance events, usually a combination of swimming, cycling, and running
 Water aerobics is aerobics in the water.
 Water basketball, mixes the rules of basketball and water polo, played in a swimming pool. Teams of five players must shoot at the goal with a ball within a specific time after gaining possession.
 Water polo is a sport of two teams played in the water with a ball.
 Water volleyball

Under water

Recreational diving 

Cave diving
Deep diving
Freediving
Ice diving
Mermaiding
Spearfishing
Underwater archaeology, particularly activity involving wreck diving
 Underwater photography, including underwater videography, is photography done under water. Numerous contests worldwide are arranged every year. Digital cameras have revolutionized how many divers participate.
 Underwater videography

Underwater sports 

 Aquathlon (underwater wrestling)
 Finswimming, some events are practiced completely underwater
 Freediving
 Snorkeling is the practice of swimming at the surface (typically of the sea) being equipped with a mask, fins, and a short tube called a snorkel.
 Spearfishing
 Sport diving (sport)
 Underwater football
 Underwater hockey is a game played underwater which has some similarities to hockey. Two teams of players use short wooden curved sticks to move a heavy puck across the pool bottom to the opponents' goal.
 Underwater ice hockey
 Underwater orienteering
 Underwater photography (sport)
 Underwater rugby is a game played underwater which has some similarities to rugby football. Two teams try to score goals by sending a slightly negatively buoyant ball into the opponents' goal placed on the bottom of the pool.
 Underwater target shooting

See also
 List of beach sports
 Outdoor recreation
 Outline of canoeing and kayaking

References

Water Sports Dictionaries